Mammoth Mountain, Mount Mammoth, Mammoth Peak, or variation, may refer to:

Mountains
 Mammoth Peak, Tuolumne Meadows, Yosemite National Park, California, USA
 Mammoth Peak, Kootenay National Park, British Columbia, Canada; former name of Hewitt Peak
 Mammoth Mountain, Inyo National Forest, California, USA

Other uses
 Mammoth Mountain Ski Area, Inyo National Forest, California, USA

See also
 Mammoth (disambiguation)